Nemanja Nikolić (born 19 October 1992) is a Serbian professional footballer who plays as a forward for Vojvodina.

Club career

Early years
Born in Kraljevo, Nikolić made his first football steps with local academy Bubamara, after which he moved to Sloga Kraljevo youth academy, and finally Metalac Kraljevo. Later he signed with the Montenegrin First League side Grbalj, where he played between 2011 and 2012.

On 22 February 2013, after he passed a ten-day trial period with a club, Nikolić signed a three-year contract with Rostov. He made his debut in the Russian Premier League on 20 October 2013 for FC Rostov in a game against FC Krylia Sovetov Samara under coach Miodrag Božović.

On 5 August 2016 Nikolić signed for FC Aktobe on a free transfer. After he end of season in the Kazakhstan Premier League, Nikolić left the club.

Spartak Subotica
In February 2017, Nikolić signed a -year deal Spartak Subotica. For the first half-season with the club, Nikolić was mostly used as a back-up for Ognjen Mudrinski, making 7 appearances without goals. At the beginning of the 2017–18 Serbian SuperLiga season, Nikolić became the first choice attacker under coach Aleksandar Veselinović, scoring a goal in the opening match of the season against OFK Bačka. After 2 scored goals and 2 assists he made in 4–0 away win against Borac Čačak in the second fixture match of the season, Nikolić was elected for the player of the week. He awarded for the second time in the 7th fixture of the same season, with 2 goals and an assist in 5–0 away victory over Vojvodina at the Karađorđe Stadium. Scoring a goal in 1–1 draw to Partizan, Nikolić was elected for the best on the field in a match played on 26 November 2017. Nikolić awarded as the club's best assistant in the mid season. In May 2018, Nikolić was elected in the best 11 players for the 2017–18 Serbian SuperLiga season, by clubs captains' and managers' choice.

Partizan
On 22 May 2018, Nikolić joined Partizan in a €350,000 transfer from Spartak Subotica. Media reported the deal also includes 20 percent of the future transfer. He was officially promoted on 28 May 2018, penning a three-year deal, when he also chose to wear number 9 jersey. He made his debut for Partizan in the first leg match of the first qualifying round for 2018–19 UEFA Europa League campaign, against Rudar Pljevlja.

Nikolić scored in the 159th Belgrade Eternal Derby, which ended in a 1–1 draw.

Loan to Vojvodina
On 19 August 2019, Nikolić signed a one-year-loan, with buyout option after 6 months, for Vojvodina.

Tobol
On 28 March 2021, Nikolić signed for FC Tobol until the end of the season. On 30 July 2021, Tobol announced the departure of Nikolić after his contract was terminated by mutual consent.

Return to Spartak Subotica
On 18 September 2021, he returned to Spartak Subotica. He signed for 1 year.

Return to Vojvodina 
On 15 June 2022, Nikolic signed with Vojvodina for 2 year.

Career statistics

Club

Honours

Club
Rostov
Russian Cup: 2013–14

Partizan
Serbian Cup: 2018–19

Individual
 Serbian SuperLiga Team of the Season: 2017–18

References

External links
 
 
 

1992 births
Living people
Sportspeople from Kraljevo
Serbian footballers
Association football forwards
OFK Grbalj players
FC Rostov players
FC Aktobe players
FK Spartak Subotica players
FK Partizan players
Al-Raed FC players
FC Tobol players
Montenegrin First League players
Russian Premier League players
Kazakhstan Premier League players
Serbian SuperLiga players
Saudi Professional League players
Serbian expatriate footballers
Serbian expatriate sportspeople in Russia
Serbian expatriate sportspeople in Kazakhstan
Serbian expatriate sportspeople in Saudi Arabia
Expatriate footballers in Russia
Expatriate footballers in Kazakhstan
Expatriate footballers in Saudi Arabia